José Millán de Poblete was a Roman Catholic prelate who served as Bishop-elect of Nueva Segovia (1675–?).

Biography
José Millán de Poblete was born in Mexico in 1635, the nephew of Miguel Millán de Poblete, Archbishop of Manila. On 27 May 1675, he was appointed during the papacy of Pope Clement X as Bishop of Nueva Segovia. Records indicate that although he was less than 50 when appointed, he only served a short period and died before he was consecrated. The next bishop of record is Francisco Pizaro de Orellana who was selected in 1680.

References

1635 births
Bishops appointed by Pope Clement X
17th-century Roman Catholic bishops in the Philippines
Roman Catholic bishops of Nueva Segovia